
In basketball, a block (short for blocked shot) occurs when a defender deflects or stops a field goal attempt without committing a foul. The top 25 highest blocks totals in National Collegiate Athletic Association (NCAA) Division I women's basketball history are listed below. While the NCAA's current three-division format has been in place since the 1973–74 season, the organization did not sponsor women's sports until the 1981–82 school year; before that time, women's college sports were governed by the Association of Intercollegiate Athletics for Women (AIAW). Blocks are a relatively new statistic in college basketball, having only become an official statistic in NCAA women's basketball beginning with the 1987–88 season.

No individual on the list is enshrined in the Naismith Memorial Basketball Hall of Fame as a player. Rebecca Lobo is a Hall of Fame member as a contributor.

All players listed played in four seasons; none were ever redshirted, and none transferred to a second school during their respective careers.

Three schools have two or more players represented on this list—Duke and UConn with three each, and  Ohio State with two. Duke is represented by Alison Bales, Elizabeth Williams, and Bego Faz Davalos; UConn by Breanna Stewart, Lobo, and Kara Wolters; and Ohio State by Jessica Davenport and Brianne Turner.

Key

Top 25 career blocks leaders

Footnotes

References
General

Specific

Blocks
Lists of women's basketball players in the United States